Alex Burger (born 6 April 1996) is a South African sailor. He competed in the 49er event at the 2020 Summer Olympics.

References

External links
 
 
 

1996 births
Living people
South African male sailors (sport)
Olympic sailors of South Africa
Sailors at the 2020 Summer Olympics – 49er
Place of birth missing (living people)